Standard Comics was an American comic book company owned by publisher Ned Pines. Standard in turn was the parent company of two comic-book lines: Better Publications and Nedor Publishing. Collectors and historians sometimes refer to them collectively as "Standard/Better/Nedor". In the late 1950s, Standard's remaining two titles were incorporated into the Pines Comics lineup along with a variety of titles from St. John Publications.

Titles
Source:
 Adventures into Darkness #5–14 (Aug. 1952 – Jun. 1954)
 Alley Oop #10–18 (Oct. 1947 – Oct. 1949)
 America's Best Comics #1–31 (Feb. 1942 – July 1949) 
 America's Biggest Comics Book #1 (1944; Standard / William H. Wise & Company)
 Barnyard Comics #1–31 (June 1944 – Sept. 1950)
Battlefront #5 (June 1952)
Best Romance #5–7 (March–Aug. 1952) 
Billy West #1–8, Bill West #9–10 (1949 – Nov. 1950; Feb.1951 & Feb. 1952)
 The Black Terror #15–27 (July 1946 – June 1949; Standard / Visual Editions, #1–14; see Nedor Comics below)
 Boots and Her Buddies #5–9 (Sept. 1948 – Sept. 1949; Standard / Visual Editions)
Brick Bradford #5–8 (July 1948 – July 1949)
Broncho Bill #5–16 (Jan. 1948 – Dec. 1950)
Buster Bunny #1–16 (Nov. 1949 – Oct. 1953)
Buz Sawyer #1–3, Buz Sawyer's Pal, Sweeney #4–5 (June 1948 – Jan. 1949; June–Sept. 1949) 
 Coo Coo Comics #1–62 (Oct. 1942 – April 1952)
 Dennis the Menace (14 issues)
 Exciting Comics #1–69 (April 1940 – Sept. 1949)
 Fighting Yank #1–29 (Sept. 1942 – Aug. 1949)
 Goofy Comics (48 issues)
 Happy Comics (40 issues)
 Joe Yank (12 issues)
 Kathy (17 issues)
 Mystery Comics (4 issues)
 New Romances (20 issues)
 Out of the Shadows (10 issues)
 Ozark Ike (15 issues)
 Sniffy the Pup (14 issues)
 Real Life Comics (59 issues)
 Startling Comics #1–53 (June 1940 – Sept. 1948)
 Supermouse (34 issues)
 Thrilling Comics #1–80 (Feb.1940 – April 1951)
 Wonder Comics #1–20 (May 1944 – Oct. 1948)

Better Publications
Source:
 Best Comics #1–4 (Nov. 1939 – Feb. 1940)
Cartoon Humor
Exciting Comics
Startling Comics
Tim Tyler

Nedor Comics
 The Black Terror #1–14 (Winter 1942/43 – Jan. 1944; continued under Standard Comics, above)
Funny Funnies #1, 68pgs (April 1943)
Goofy Comics #1–14 (June 1943 – 1953)
Real Funnies #1–3 (Jan. 1943 – June 1943)

Pines Comics
 Adventures of Mighty Mouse #129–144 (picked up from St. John, went to Dell Comics)
 Clay Cody, Gunslinger (1 issue)
 Dinky Duck #16–19 (picked up from St. John)
 Dennis the Menace #15–31 (picked up from Standard, went to Fawcett Comics)
 Gandy Goose #5–6 (1956–1958); picked up from St. John
 Heckle and Jeckle #25–34 (picked up from St. John, went to Dell)
 Little Roquefort Comics #10 (picked up from St. John)
 Paul Terry's Mighty Mouse #68–71 (picked up from St. John), retitled Mighty Mouse #72–83
 Supermouse #35–45 (picked up from Standard)
 Sweetie Pie #15 (picked up from Ajax-Farrell)
 Terrytoons, the Terry Bears #4 (picked up from St. John)
 Tom Terrific #1–6

References

Standard Comics